The Chamber of States was the upper chamber of the bicameral legislature of the German Democratic Republic (East Germany) from  its founding in 1949 until 1952, at which time it was largely sidelined, when the five Länder (states) of East Germany ceased to exist and were replaced with smaller administrative regions. The Chamber of States itself was dissolved on 8 December 1958. The lower chamber, which continued in existence until German reunification in 1990, was the People's Chamber (Volkskammer).

In the Federal Republic of Germany the expression Länderkammer is sometimes used to denote the Bundesrat although it is not legally classified as a legislative chamber.

Idea and reality

After 1945, the Soviet military administration established the five Länder of Mecklenburg-Vorpommern, Brandenburg, Saxony, Saxony-Anhalt and Thuringia.

Initially, in 1949, the communists aimed for a quasi-unitary state, with some degree of decentralization. Laws were to be made by the central legislature in East Berlin, and the Länder authorities were responsible for the implementation of the laws.

In practice, due to the democratic centralism of the SED, the GDR rapidly developed strong centralist tendencies.  However, it initially operated in this bicameral framework in which the states were represented. The Chamber of States theoretically had the power to introduce bills and to veto laws proposed by the People's Chamber, although another vote in the People's Chamber could overturn such a veto. The Chamber of States never made use of its veto. The two chambers also elected the President of East Germany in joint session.

According to the Constitution of East Germany, in addition to the People's Chamber, a “provisional Land Chamber” was formed. The fifty members of the Land Chamber were to be determined by the assemblies in the various Länder, according to the memberships of these assemblies. Saxony sent thirteen delegates, Saxony-Anhalt eleven, Thuringia ten, Brandenburg nine, and Mecklenburg-Vorpommern seven. East Berlin sent thirteen delegates, but they did not have voting rights owing to Berlin as a whole still legally being occupied territory. (A similar arrangement existed in West Berlin, in which the city's delegates in the Bundestag and Bundesrat had no voting rights.)

In 1952, the East German Länder transferred their administrative functions to the smaller regional districts (Bezirke), effectively dissolving themselves. The Chamber of States remained in existence, but became increasingly redundant. Since the Landtage could no longer meet to elect members of the Chamber of States, the 1954 delegates for each Länder were chosen by a special meeting of the District Assemblies (Bezirkstage) of that state. The members of the Chamber of States elected in 1958 were directly elected by their Bezirkstage. These delegates were appointed as a "suicide squad," raising no objection as the People's Chamber abolished the Chamber of States and the Länder on 8 December 1958.

Presidents of the Chamber of States

Vice-Presidents of the Chamber of States

See also
Administrative divisions of the German Democratic Republic
Politics of East Germany

External links
Law on the composition of the upper house of the German Democratic Republic.

Politics of East Germany
1949 establishments in East Germany
1958 disestablishments
Defunct upper houses
Historical legislatures in Germany